Salento (Salentino: Salentu, Salentino Griko: Σαλέντο) is a cultural, historical and geographic region at the southern end of the administrative region of Apulia in Southern Italy. It is a sub-peninsula of the Italian Peninsula, sometimes described as the "heel" of the Italian "boot".
It encompasses the entire administrative area of the province of Lecce, a large part of the province of Brindisi and part of that of Taranto.

The peninsula is also known as Terra d'Otranto, and in the past Sallentina. In ancient times it was called variously Calabria or Messapia.

History

Messapia (from Greek Μεσσαπία) was the ancient name of a region of Italy largely corresponding to modern Salento. It was inhabited chiefly by the Messapii in classical times. Pokorny derives the toponym from the reconstructed PIE *medhyo-, "middle" and PIE *ap-, "water" (Mess-apia, "amid waters"). Pokorny compares the toponym Messapia to another ancient Italic toponym, Salapia, "salt water", a city in Apulia.

Late Bronze Age settlements were complex and comparatively rich, They lost their wealth at the beginning of the Iron Age and degraded into dispersed huts. Farmers cultivated cereals and used meadows for stock grazing. In the subsequent archaic time stone built houses were erected accompanied by funerary plots. Trade with the Greek was established. Surplus production and the intensification of wine and olive oil production enabled the culture of the Hellenistic period. The Romans conquered the Salento in the third century BC leading to a consolidation process of farms.

Geography

The Salento peninsula is composed of limestone, dividing the Gulf of Taranto to the west from the Strait of Otranto on the east, with the Adriatic Sea to the north and the Ionian Sea to the south. Known also as "peninsula salentina", from a geo-morphologic point of view it encompasses the land borders between Ionian and the Adriatic Seas, to the "Messapic threshold", a depression that runs along the Taranto-Ostuni line and separates it from the Murge.

The climate is typically Mediterranean with hot, dry summers and mild, rainy winters which provides suitable conditions for the cultivation of olives, citrus fruits and palm trees. The generally flat topography and surrounding seas can make Salento prone to windy weather year round. 

Winters are mild and rainy with temperatures generally hovering in the teens °C during the day. Occasional bora winds from the northeast can bring colder temperatures to the east of the Italian Peninsula. Snowfall has been recorded as recently as 2017 but is generally very rare in coastal Salento. In contrast, southerly sirocco winds can bring warm temperatures of 20°C+ even during the midwinter months. 

Alongside much of southern Italy, summers are hot, dry and sunny. While the seas which surround Salento moderate it from the extreme heat seen in Foggia and Basilicata, summer temperatures are still high with temperatures occasionally reaching 40°C or higher during heatwaves. Sirocco winds from the south occasionally deposit dust and sand from the Sahara in the coastal towns of Salento during such heatwaves. Humidity levels can be high and summer thunderstorms are not unknown. 

Its borders are:
 Taranto, in the Province of Taranto
 Pilone, in the territory of Ostuni, in the Province of Brindisi
 Santa Maria di Leuca, in the Province of Lecce.

Cities and towns in Salento

Province of Lecce
Acquarica del Capo, Alessano, Alezio, Alliste, Andrano, Aradeo, Arnesano, Bagnolo del Salento, Botrugno, Calimera, Campi Salentina, Cannole, Caprarica di Lecce, Carmiano, Carpignano Salentino, Casarano, Castri di Lecce, Castrignano de' Greci, Castrignano del Capo, Castro, Cavallino, Collepasso, Copertino, Corigliano d'Otranto, Corsano, Cursi, Cutrofiano, Diso, Gagliano del Capo, Galatina, Galatone, Gallipoli, Giuggianello, Giurdignano, Guagnano, Lecce, Lequile, Leverano, Lizzanello, Maglie, Martano, Martignano, Matino, Melendugno, Melissano, Melpignano, Miggiano, Minervino di Lecce, Monteroni di Lecce, Montesano Salentino, Morciano di Leuca, Muro Leccese, Nardò, Neviano, Nociglia, Novoli, Ortelle, Otranto, Palmariggi, Parabita, Patù, Poggiardo, Porto Cesareo, Presicce, Racale, Ruffano, Salice Salentino, Salve, San Cassiano, San Cesario di Lecce, San Donato di Lecce, San Pietro in Lama, Sanarica, Sannicola, Santa Cesarea Terme, Scorrano, Seclì, Sogliano Cavour, Soleto, Specchia, Spongano, Squinzano, Sternatia, Supersano, Surano, Surbo, Taurisano, Taviano, Tiggiano, Trepuzzi, Tricase, Tuglie, Ugento, Uggiano la Chiesa, Veglie, Vernole, Zollino.

Province of Brindisi
Brindisi, Carovigno, Cellino San Marco, Erchie, Francavilla Fontana, Latiano, Mesagne, Oria, Ostuni, San Donaci, San Michele Salentino, San Pancrazio Salentino, San Pietro Vernotico, San Vito dei Normanni, Torchiarolo, Torre Santa Susanna, Villa Castelli.

Province of Taranto
Avetrana, Carosino, Faggiano, Fragagnano, Grottaglie, Leporano, Lizzano, Manduria, Maruggio, Monteiasi, Monteparano, Pulsano, Roccaforzata, San Giorgio Ionico, San Marzano di San Giuseppe, Sava, Taranto, Torricella.

Language

In Salentino, the Salentino dialect of the Sicilian language is predominantly spoken, although an old Hellenic dialect (known as Griko) is also spoken in a few inland towns.

Transportation 
The nearest international airports are those of Brindisi and Bari (the latter is out of Salento but not far).

A 2-lane freeway connects Salento to Bari. The main railway line ends at Lecce. Other locations are served by regional railroads.

Leisure ports are those of: Taranto, Brindisi, Campomarino di Maruggio's tourist and leisure Marina, Gallipoli, Santa Maria di Leuca, Otranto.

Coastal towers
The coastal towers in Salento are coastal watchtowers, as the peninsula's coast was long subject to maritime attacks by the Saracens. The first towers may have been built by Normans. The remaining historic towers are mostly from the 15th and 16th centuries. Many are now in ruins.

Food and gastronomy 
Some of the popular dishes from the Salento area include: 
 Orecchiette, 'ear-shaped' pasta, often cooked with tomato sauce and a strong creamy cheese called ricotta schianta, or with rapini
 Parmigiana di melanzane, made with aubergines, tomato sauce and cheese like mozzarella or other
 Pitta di patate, a savoury pie made with mashed potatoes
Turcinieddhri, grilled lamb offal
 Purciaddruzzi, fried hand-made small cookies with honey, eaten during Christmas time

Tourism 
In the province of Lecce, the Ciolo cave is one of the main tourist destinations.

Sagre food festivals 
Salento’s sagre food festivals show off local cuisine, cooking traditions and local culture. These communal feasts are vibrant, welcoming occasions that provide an introduction to Salento’s cuisine.

Gay culture
Salento is a major holiday destination for the Italian gay population. Long hot summers, varied coastline and vibrant nightlife draw an international gay crowd. A sophisticated gay scene has developed around the southern Salento town of Gallipoli, the lidos at Baia Verde and nearby naturist beaches.

Salento Pride is celebrated annually.

Gallery

See also 

 Grecìa Salentina
 Salentino dialect
 Lecce
 Brindisi
 Gallipoli
 Otranto
 Magna Grecia
 Catepanate of Italy

References

 
Peninsulas of Italy
Landforms of Apulia
Province of Lecce
Province of Brindisi
Province of Taranto
Adriatic Sea